Hare Te Rangi is a New Zealand former rugby league footballer who represented New Zealand Māori at the 2000 World Cup.

Playing career
Te Rangi started his career with the Piako Warriors, who won the Bay of Plenty Rugby League grand final in 1995. He was then selected for the Auckland Warriors development program in 1996.

In 1997 he was the leading try scorer in the Auckland Rugby League competition, winning the Tetley Trophy for the Otahuhu Leopards.

He played for the Leopards in the 2000 Bartercard Cup grand final before switching in 2001 to the Eastern Tornadoes. As a Bay of Plenty representative, in 2001 he was selected for the Northern Districts team that played the touring French side.

Representative career
Te Rangi represented the New Zealand at Under 17s, Under 18s and Under 19s.

In 1998 he was selected for the New Zealand Māori tour of the Cook Islands. He again represented the Māori in 2000 against Fiji and at the World Cup.

Te Rangi also toured Australia in 2000 with the New Zealand Residents.

Personal life
Te Rangi has also represented the Bay of Plenty in Lawn Bowls.

References

1977 births
Living people
Auckland rugby league team players
Bay of Plenty rugby league team players
Eastern Tornadoes players
Junior Kiwis players
New Zealand rugby league players
New Zealand male bowls players
New Zealand Māori rugby league team players
Northern Districts rugby league team players
Otahuhu Leopards players
Rugby league halfbacks
Rugby league players from Rotorua